Pieni-Kiimanen is a medium-sized lake in Kainuu region in northern Finland. It is located in Sotkamo and it belongs to the Oulujoki main catchment area. Pieni-Kiimanen is separated from another lake Iso-Kiimanen with strait Pajusalmi.

See also
List of lakes in Finland

References

Lakes of Sotkamo